The 2019 Big Ten men's basketball tournament was the postseason men's basketball tournament for the Big Ten Conference of the 2018–19 NCAA Division I men's basketball season. The tournament returned to its more traditional Midwest roots as it will be held at the United Center in Chicago, Illinois. The tournament was held from March 13 through March 17, 2019.

Michigan State defeated Michigan 65–60 in the championship game to win the tournament, marking the school's sixth tournament championship. As a result, they received the conference's automatic bid to the NCAA tournament.

Seeds
All 14 Big Ten schools participated in the tournament. Teams were seeded by conference record, with a tiebreaker system used to seed teams with identical conference records. The top 10 teams received a first round bye and the top four teams received a double bye. Tiebreaking procedures remain unchanged from the 2018 tournament.

Schedule

*Game times in Central Time. #Rankings denote tournament seeding.

Bracket

* denotes overtime period

Game summaries

First round

Second round

Quarterfinals

Semifinals

Championship

All-Tournament Team
Cassius Winston, Michigan State – Big Ten tournament Most Outstanding Player  
Ignas Brazdeikis, Michigan
Zavier Simpson, Michigan
Jordan Murphy, Minnesota
James Palmer Jr., Nebraska

References

Big Ten men's basketball tournament
Tournament
Big Ten men's basketball tournament
Big Ten men's basketball tournament
Big Ten men's basketball tournament
Basketball competitions in Chicago